Peter Thomas Manley (December 8, 1904 – February 12, 1998) was an Ontario dairy farmer and political figure. He represented Stormont in the Legislative Assembly of Ontario as a Liberal member from 1951 to 1963.

He was born in Berwick, Stormont County, Ontario in 1904.

The Ottawa Journal carried this story in 1958 reporting on how Peter Manley was the only Liberal to defeat a Conservative in a recent provincial election, with comments about how he balanced political life with the farm duties and the family.

References

External links

1904 births
1998 deaths
Ontario Liberal Party MPPs
People from the United Counties of Stormont, Dundas and Glengarry